The Fairchild BQ-3, also known as the Model 79, was an early expendable unmanned aerial vehicle – referred to at the time as an "assault drone" – developed by Fairchild Aircraft from the company's AT-21 Gunner advanced trainer during the Second World War for use by the United States Army Air Forces. Two examples of the type were built and flight-tested, but the progress of guided missiles rendered the assault drone quickly obsolete, and the type was not produced.

Design and development
Development of the BQ-3 began in October, 1942, under a program for the development of "aerial torpedoes", later and more commonly referred to as "assault drones", that had been instigated in March of that year. Fairchild was awarded a contract for the construction of two XBQ-3 prototypes, based largely on the AT-21 Gunner advanced gunnery trainer already in United States Army Air Forces service.

The XBQ-3 was a twin-engined, low-wing aircraft, fitted with retractable tricycle landing gear and a twin-finned empennage; although the aircraft was intended to be operated by radio control with television assist, a two-seat cockpit was included in the design for testing and ferry flights. Like the contemporary Fleetwings BQ-2, the aircraft would be destroyed in the act of striking the target.

Flight testing
The first flight of the XBQ-3 took place in July 1944; later that month, one of the prototypes was severely damaged in a forced landing. Despite the accident, flight testing continued; however, the assault drone was determined to have no significant advantage over conventional bombers, and advances in the field of guided missiles were rapidly rendering the concept obsolete. As a result, the program was cancelled towards the end of 1944.

Specifications (XBQ-3)

See also

References

Further reading

BQ-1
1940s United States bomber aircraft
Unmanned aerial vehicles of the United States
World War II guided missiles of the United States
Cancelled military aircraft projects of the United States
Mid-wing aircraft
Aircraft first flown in 1944
Twin piston-engined tractor aircraft